Church Minshull is a civil parish in Cheshire East, England. It contains 22 buildings that are recorded in the National Heritage List for England as designated listed buildings.  Of these, four are listed at Grade II*, the middle grade, and the others are at Grade II.  Apart from the village of Church Minshull the parish is rural.  A high proportion of the listed buildings are houses or cottages, many of which are timber-framed, and date back to the 17th century.  The Middlewich Branch of the Shropshire Union Canal and the River Weaver pass through the parish.  Three structures associated with the canal are listed, a bridge, an aqueduct, and a former warehouse.  The other listed buildings are farmhouses, farm buildings, the village church and its gates, a public house, and two bridges.

Key

Buildings

References
Citations

Sources

 

 

Listed buildings in the Borough of Cheshire East
Lists of listed buildings in Cheshire